B. Jean Silver (possibly Jean B. Silver, as named in some sources; July 25, 1926 – March 14, 2000) was an American politician who served seven consecutive terms in the Washington House of Representatives from 1983 to 1997.  Born in Spokane, Washington, she represented Washington's 5th and then 6th legislative districts, both in Spokane County, as a Republican.

Silver worked as a certified public accountant and a consultant on economic development financing, including as a contract consultant to the City of Spokane.  With her husband Chuck, she also co-owned a glass company.  She served on the board of Washington Water Power Company (now Avista).

References

1926 births
2000 deaths
Republican Party members of the Washington House of Representatives
Women state legislators in Washington (state)